The Art Building and Annex (or Art Annex) are buildings on the Portland State University campus in Portland, Oregon, United States. The Annex underwent a renovation in 2009. Both buildings have been considered for demolition.

See also
 List of Portland State University buildings

References

Portland State University buildings